Nkanyiso Zungu (born 23 January 1996) is a South African professional soccer player who plays as a forward for Orlando Pirates.

References

1996 births
Living people
South African soccer players
AmaZulu F.C. players
Jomo Cosmos F.C. players
Stellenbosch F.C. players
Orlando Pirates F.C. players
South African Premier Division players
National First Division players
Association football midfielders